Ashton Mitchell (born August 14, 1988) is an American professional basketball player who last played for Valmiera of the Latvian Basketball League. He played college basketball at the Sam Houston State University.

Professional career
After going undrafted in the 2010 NBA draft, Mitchell signed with BK Liepājas Lauvas of the Latvian Basketball League for the 2010–11 season. In November 2011, he was acquired by the Rio Grande Valley Vipers of the NBA Development League. In January 2012, he was waived by the Vipers.

In November 2013, he signed with BC Kolín of the Czech Republic National Basketball League. He left them in March 2014, and signed with Metalac Valjevo of Serbia for the rest of the season.

On February 17, 2015, Mitchell signed with Alba Fehérvár of Hungary for the rest of the season.

On December 10, 2016, Mitchell signed with Latvian club Valmiera.

References

External links
Profile at eurobasket.com
Profile at fiba.com
Profile at realgm.com

1988 births
Living people
African-American basketball players
Alba Fehérvár players
American expatriate basketball people in Hungary
American expatriate basketball people in Latvia
American expatriate basketball people in Serbia
American expatriate basketball people in the Czech Republic
Basketball players from New Orleans
BK Liepājas Lauvas players
KK Metalac Valjevo players
Point guards
Rio Grande Valley Vipers players
Sam Houston Bearkats men's basketball players
American men's basketball players
21st-century African-American sportspeople
20th-century African-American people